Skarpsno is a tram stop on the Oslo Tramway.

Located at Skarpsno, it was opened by Kristiania Elektriske Sporvei on 2 March 1894 as a part of the first stretch of what would become the Skøyen Line. It is served by line 13.

References

Oslo Tramway stations in Oslo
Railway stations opened in 1894